The women's 4 × 100 metres relay event at the 2003 Summer Universiade was held in Daegu, South Korea with the final on August 30.

Results

Final

References
Results

Athletics at the 2003 Summer Universiade
2003